Albert Henry Sweetser (May 24, 1848 – July 9, 1889) was an American snuff manufacturer and politician.

Early life
Sweetser was born on May 24, 1848, to George H. and Maria (Starr) Sweetser. He became a member of the Methodist Episcopal Church on October 4, 1863, and served as a steward, trustee, class-leader, and Sunday-school superintendent of the Saugus church. On April 19, 1871, he married Annie Penhallow Jordan in Berwick, Maine. They had three sons, George A., William I., and Philip S. Sweetser. George A. Sweetser was a noted lawyer and rose expert.

Business career
Sweetser inherited his father's interest in Sweetser brothers, a tobacco firm founded by his grandfather, Charles Sweetser, in 1820. He ran the business with his uncle, Charles A. Sweetser until October 1, 1874 when he sold his interest to his son, Charles H. Sweetser. On January 1, 1881, Albert Sweetser acquired his cousin's interest in the business. In November 1885 he sold the company to Joseph A. Raddin. After leaving the tobacco business, Sweetser was connected with the Maverick Oil Company of East Boston and served as the Boston agent for Standard Oil. Sweetser was also involved in real estate development. He built and developed Jackson Street, Mountain Avenue, and Castle Street in Saugus' Cliftondale neighborhood.

Politics
In 1883, Sweetser represented the 13th Essex District, which consisted of the towns of Saugus, Lynnfield, Middleton, and Topsfield, in the Massachusetts House of Representatives.

Death
Sweetser died on July 9, 1889, after a long illness.

References

1848 births
1889 deaths
American businesspeople in the oil industry
American tobacco industry executives
Republican Party members of the Massachusetts House of Representatives
Members of the Methodist Episcopal Church
People from Saugus, Massachusetts